Wendell High School is a four-year public secondary school in Wendell, Idaho. It is the main high school operated by the Wendell School District.

Athletics

Wendell High School is classified as a 2A school (enrollment between 160 and 319) by the IHSAA. It competes in the Sawtooth Central Conference.

School colors are navy and gold, and the mascot is the Trojan.

See also

List of high schools in Idaho

References

Public high schools in Idaho
Schools in Gooding County, Idaho